This is a list of Australian Statutory Instruments from 1906.

1906 Commonwealth Of Australia Numbered Acts 
 Supply Act (no 1) 1906-7 (no. 1, 1906-1907
 Governor-general's Residences Act 1906 (no. 2, 1906)
 Meteorology Act 1906 (no. 3, 1906)
 Designs Act 1906 (no. 4, 1906)
 Judiciary Act 1906 (no. 5, 1906)
 Supply Act (no 2) 1906-7 (no. 6, 1906)
 Appropriation (works And Buildings) Act 1906-7 (no. 7, 1906)
 Audit Act 1906 (no. 8, 1906)
 Australian Industries Preservation Act 1906 (no. 9, 1906)
 Tasmanian Cable Rates Act 1906 (no. 10, 1906)
 Referendum (constitution Alteration) Act 1906 (no. 11, 1906)
 Electoral Validating Act 1906 (no. 12, 1906)
 Lands Acquisition Act 1906 (no. 13, 1906)
 Customs Tariff 1906 (no. 14, 1906)
 Excise Tariff (amendment) 1906 (no. 15, 1906)
 Excise Tariff 1906 (no. 16, 1906)
 Customs Tariff (South African Preference) 1906 (no. 17, 1906)
 Commonwealth Electoral Act 1906 (no. 18, 1906)
 Patents Act 1906 (no. 19, 1906)
 Excise Tariff 1906 (no. 20, 1906)
 Spirits Act 1906 (no. 21, 1906)
 Pacific Island Labourers Act 1906 (no. 22, 1906)
 Appropriation Act 1906-7 (no. 23, 1906)

See also 
 List of Acts of the Parliament of Australia
 List of Statutory Instruments of Australia

External links 
 1907 Commonwealth of Australia Numbered Act http://www.austlii.edu.au/au/legis/cth/num_act/1907/
 COMLAW Historical Acts http://www.comlaw.gov.au/Browse/ByTitle/Acts/Historical
 COMLAW Select Statutory Instruments http://www.comlaw.gov.au/Browse/ByYearNumber/SelectLIsandStatRules/Asmade/0/

Lists of the Statutory Instruments of Australia
Statutory Instruments